John Ware Reclaimed is a Canadian documentary film, directed by Cheryl Foggo and released in 2020. The film profiles John Ware, an African American man who moved to Alberta in the 1880s and became one of the province's first significant ranchers.

Made for the National Film Board of Canada, the film blends a portrait of her own contemporary investigation into Ware's history with animation, music and historical reenactments in which Ware is portrayed by actor Fred Whitfield.

The film premiered at the Calgary International Film Festival on September 24, 2020, and was subsequently screened at the 2020 Vancouver International Film Festival.

References

External links

2020 films
2020 documentary films
Canadian documentary films
Documentary films about Black Canadians
National Film Board of Canada documentaries
Films shot in Alberta
2020s English-language films
2020s Canadian films